Alfredo Zuany (born 21 July 1934) is a Mexican former professional boxer who competed from 1955 to 1961. and the former Mexican National Heavyweight Champion.

Early life
Alfredo was a Mexican boxer of Italian heritage from his father's side.
He lived in Los Angeles and married Alicia Saenz in 1962. They had three children (sons Alfredo, Tony, Chago) and three grandchildren (Stephanie Zuany, Steven Zuany, Dianna Zuany).

Professional career
In November 1957, Zuany beat the undefeated Puggy Jones by K.O. just 32 seconds into the sixth round of their bout in Phoenix, Arizona.

In September 1959, Zuany beat the former world heavyweight champion Ezzard Charles by unanimous decision. The bout was held in Ciudad Juarez, Chihuahua.

Mexican Olympic team for the Helsinki Games
Pan-American Game participant
Central American Game participant

Professional boxing record

| style="text-align:center" colspan="9"|34 Wins (21 knockouts, 13 decisions), 3 Losses, 1 Draw
|- style="text-align:center;background:#e3e3e3"
| style="border-style:none none solid solid"|Res.
| style="border-style:none none solid solid"|Record
| style="border-style:none none solid solid"|Opponent
| style="border-style:none none solid solid"|Type
| style="border-style:none none solid solid"|Rd., Time
| style="border-style:none none solid solid"|Date
| style="border-style:none none solid solid"|Location
| style="border-style:none none solid solid"|Notes
|- align=center
|Win
|34–3–1
|align=left| Joe Thomas
|
|
|
|align=left|
|align=left|
|- align=center
|Win
|33–3–1
|align=left| Willie Lee
|
|
|
|align=left|
|align=left|
|- align=center
|Win
|32–3–1
|align=left| Dave Rent
|
|
|
|align=left|
|align=left|
|- align=center
|Loss
|31–3–1
|align=left| Larry Maldonado
|
|
|
|align=left|
|align=left|
|- align=center
|Win
|31–2–1
|align=left| Yaqui Lopez
|
|
|
|align=left|
|align=left|
|- align=center
|Win
|30–2–1
|align=left| Tommy Sims
|
|
|
|align=left|
|align=left|
|- align=center
|Draw
|29–2–1
|align=left| Otis Fuller
|
|
|
|align=left|
|align=left|
|- align=center
|Win
|29–2
|align=left| Matt Jackson
|
|
|
|align=left|
|align=left|
|- align=center
|Win
|28–2
|align=left| Donnie Fleeman
|
|
|
|align=left|
|align=left|
|- align=center
|Win
|27–2
|align=left| Alvin Williams
|
|
|
|align=left|
|align=left|
|- align=center
|Win
|26–2
|align=left| Matt Jackson
|
|
|
|align=left|
|align=left|
|- align=center
|Loss
|25–2
|align=left| Alvin Williams
|
|
|
|align=left|
|align=left|
|- align=center
|Win
|25–1
|align=left| Freddy Milton
|
|
|
|align=left|
|align=left|
|- align=center
|Win
|24–1
|align=left| Toro Cardenas
|
|
|
|align=left|
|align=left|
|- align=center
|Win
|23–1
|align=left| Frankie Haynes
|
|
|
|align=left|
|align=left|
|- align=center
|Win
|22–1
|align=left| Bob Baker
|
|
|
|align=left|
|align=left|
|- align=center
|Win
|21–1
|align=left| Ezzard Charles
|
|
|
|align=left|
|align=left|
|- align=center
|Win
|20–1
|align=left| Sonny Andrews
|
|
|
|align=left|
|align=left|
|- align=center
|Win
|19–1
|align=left| David Walker
|
|
|
|align=left|
|align=left|
|- align=center
|Win
|18–1
|align=left| Cal Cooper
|
|
|
|align=left|
|align=left|
|- align=center
|Win
|17–1
|align=left| Walter Robinson
|
|
|
|align=left|
|align=left|
|- align=center
|Win
|16–1
|align=left| Otis Fuller
|
|
|
|align=left|
|align=left|
|- align=center
|Win
|15–1
|align=left| Lajuin Burks
|
|
|
|align=left|
|align=left|
|- align=center
|Win
|14–1
|align=left| Puggy Jones
|
|
|
|align=left|
|align=left|
|- align=center
|Win
|13–1
|align=left| Otis Fuller
|
|
|
|align=left|
|align=left|
|- align=center
|Win
|12–1
|align=left| Alvin Williams
|
|
|
|align=left|
|align=left|
|- align=center
|Win
|11–1
|align=left| Willie Scott
|
|
|
|align=left|
|align=left|
|- align=center
|Win
|10–1
|align=left| Ted Hutchinson
|
|
|
|align=left|
|align=left|
|- align=center
|Win
|9–1
|align=left| Johnny Hollins
|
|
|
|align=left|
|align=left|
|- align=center
|Win
|8–1
|align=left| Fred Lewis
|
|
|
|align=left|
|align=left|
|- align=center
|Loss
|7–1
|align=left| Monroe Ratliff
|
|
|
|align=left|
|align=left|
|- align=center
|Win
|7–0
|align=left| Gene Thompson
|
|
|
|align=left|
|align=left|
|- align=center
|Win
|6–0
|align=left| Chubby Duez
|
|
|
|align=left|
|align=left|
|- align=center
|Win
|5–0
|align=left| Kid Percy
|
|
|
|align=left|
|align=left|
|- align=center
|Win
|4–0
|align=left| Jose Gaitan
|
|
|
|align=left|
|align=left|
|- align=center
|Win
|3–0
|align=left| Jose Gaitan
|
|
|
|align=left|
|align=left|
|- align=center
|Win
|2–0
|align=left| Tommy Ramirez
|
|
|
|align=left|
|align=left|
|- align=center
|Win
|1–0
|align=left| Tommy Ramirez
|
|
|
|align=left|
|align=left|

References

External links

People from Ciudad Juárez
Boxers from Chihuahua (state)
Heavyweight boxers
1935 births
Living people
Mexican male boxers